Mihael Vončina (born 25 February 1969 in SFR Yugoslavia) is a retired Slovenian footballer.

External links
Profile at PrvaLiga 
Profile at NZS 

1969 births
Living people
Yugoslav footballers
Slovenian footballers
Association football forwards
NK Olimpija Ljubljana (1945–2005) players
NK Ljubljana players
NK Primorje players
NK Domžale players
NK Ivančna Gorica players
Slovenia international footballers